Group Marriage is a 1973 sex comedy film directed by Stephanie Rothman.

Plot
Chris (Aimée Eccles) is not getting along with boyfriend Sandor (Solomon Sturges) and has an affair with parole officer Dennis (Jeff Pomerantz). Dennis invites the couple to dinner with his ex-girlfriend Jan (Victoria Vetri). At a picnic on the beach, Jan meets lifeguard Phil (Zack Taylor), who later sleeps with Chris and moves in with the other five. Phil brings in a person, lawyer Elaine (Claudia Jennings). The "group marriage" of the six of them attracts media attention.

Cast
Victoria Vetri as Jan
 Aimée Eccles as Chris
 Solomon Sturges as Sander
Claudia Jennings as Elaine
 Zack Taylor as Phil
 Jeff Pomerantz as Dennis
 Norman Bartold as Findley

See also

 List of American films of 1973

References

External links

1970s exploitation films
1973 films
1970s English-language films
1970s sex comedy films
American sexploitation films
American sex comedy films
1973 comedy films
1970s American films